Dr. Yarob Suleiman Badr (born June 3, 1959 - Damascus, Syria) is a former Minister of Transport for Syria. He was previously a professor of civil engineering at Tishreen University in Latakia. He holds a PhD. from the École nationale des ponts et chaussées in Paris, France.

See also

Cabinet of Syria

References

1959 births
Living people
Tishreen University alumni
École des Ponts ParisTech alumni
Transport ministers of Syria
People from Damascus